Stheven Adán Robles Ruiz (born 12 November 1995) is a Guatemalan professional footballer who plays for Liga Nacional club Comunicaciones and the Guatemala national team.

International career
He debuted internationally on 9 January 2015, with the Guatemala U20 team during the participation at the 2015 CONCACAF U-20 Championship in Jamaica.

On 9 June 2019, he made his senior debut in a friendly match against Paraguay in a 2-0 defeat.

On 10 September 2019, Robles scored his first goal for Guatemala against Puerto Rico in a 5-0 victory in the CONCACAF Nations League.

International goals
Scores and results list Guatemala's goal tally first.

Honours
Comunicaciones
Liga Nacional de Guatemala: Clausura 2015, Clausura 2022
CONCACAF League: 2021

References

External links
 

1995 births
Living people
Guatemalan footballers
Guatemala international footballers
Association football midfielders
Comunicaciones F.C. players
Liga Nacional de Fútbol de Guatemala players
2015 CONCACAF U-20 Championship players
2021 CONCACAF Gold Cup players